Edward Blackett may refer to:

Sir Edward Blackett, 2nd Baronet (1649–1718), English landowner and politician
Sir Edward Blackett, 3rd Baronet (1683–1756), English Navy captain
Sir Edward Blackett, 4th Baronet (1719–1804), baronet and member of the British House of Commons for Northumberland
Sir Edward Blackett, 6th Baronet (1805–1885), English soldier and civil servant
Sir Edward Blackett, 7th Baronet (1831–1909), English soldier and aide-de-camp to Queen Victoria